CHPB-FM is a Canadian adult contemporary radio station broadcasting at 98.1 MHz on the FM dial in Cochrane, Ontario.

The station began broadcasting in 2003 under the ownership of Tri-Tel Communications. On November 19, 2003, the Haliburton Broadcasting Group was given approval to acquire CHPB-FM from Tri-Tel.

CHPB-FM is a sister station of CFIF-FM in Iroquois Falls. The station airs an adult contemporary format branded as 98.1 Moose FM.

On April 23, 2012 Vista Broadcast Group, which owns a number of radio stations in western Canada, announced a deal to acquire Haliburton Broadcasting Group, in cooperation with Westerkirk Capital. The transaction was approved by the CRTC on October 19, 2012.

References

External links
98.1 Moose FM

Hpb
Hpb
Hpb
Cochrane, Ontario
Radio stations established in 2003
2003 establishments in Ontario